Mortal Presents: Pura is the fourth full-length studio album by Christian dance band Mortal. It is their final album with Intense/Frontline Records.

Track listing
 "Judah" – 5:24
 "Grip" – 4:15
 "Sand Starr" – 0:54	
 "Solamente" – 5:04	
 "Nightfall and Splendor" – 6:01
 "Pura" – 7:25
 "Liquid Gift" – 4:41	
 "Gaza" – 5:10
 "Bells" – 4:15
 "The Nightfall" – 4:06

Personnel
Jyro Xhan
Jerome Fontamillas

References
Mortal Presents: Pura on Allmusic database

Footnotes

1995 albums
Mortal (band) albums